Stephen Smyth FMS is a Marist Brother from Scotland. Between 2007 and 2014 he served as General Secretary of Action of Churches Together in Scotland; the first Roman Catholic to hold this post. He retired in 2014 and was succeeded by the Rev Matthew Ross.

Background
He was born in Glasgow in 1950. He has a Master of Ministry and Theology degree from the University of Sheffield, where he studied at the Urban Theology Unit. Before working with Action of Churches Together in Scotland, he was for the previous seven years Ecumenical Officer of Glasgow Churches Together and has a background working in education.

References

External links
Action of Churches Together in Scotland
Glasgow Churches Together
Scottish Government - National Conversation, 2008 - ACTS meeting

Marist Brothers
Alumni of the University of Sheffield
1950 births
Living people